Kudligere is hobli and village of the Bhadravathi taluk, Shimoga district, Karnataka, India.

External links

Villages in Shimoga district